The 2014 LA Galaxy season was the club's nineteenth season of existence, and their nineteenth consecutive season in Major League Soccer, the top tier of American soccer.

The Galaxy won a league-leading fifth MLS Cup by defeating the New England Revolution in the final 2–1 in extra time. The club reached the quarterfinals of the 2013-14 CONCACAF Champions League before being knocked out by Tijuana, and were eliminated in the fifth round of the U.S. Open Cup by the Carolina Railhawks.

All-star Landon Donovan retired at the end of the season, after winning his sixth MLS Cup and fourth with the Galaxy. He would come out of retirement and sign with the Galaxy during the 2016 season.

Background

Transfers

In

Out

Loan in

Loan out

Player information

Roster

Current roster

Out on loan

Friendlies 
All times in Pacific Time Zone.

Preseason

Mid-season

Major League Soccer

Tables

Western Conference

Overall

Regular season 

All times in Pacific Time Zone.

Playoffs

Western Conference Semifinal

Western Conference Final

MLS Cup

U.S. Open Cup 

As an MLS team, the Galaxy entered in the fourth round.

Fourth round

Fifth round

CONCACAF Champions League

Quarterfinals

See also 
 2014 in American soccer

References 

LA Galaxy seasons
Los Angeles Galaxy
Los Angeles Galaxy
2014 in sports in California
MLS Cup champion seasons